Boult-sur-Suippe (literally Boult on Suippe) is a commune of the Marne department in northeastern France.

Geography
The commune is traversed by the Suippe river.

Population

History
A cemetery in the village was used by the Germans between October 1914 and October 1918, and was perhaps directly linked to the battles of Reims, also called the Second Battle of the Marne and surrounding forts. Recent archaeological investigations have discovered over 500 graves in the cemetery, some of them identified as German and English troops, a few who were listed as Missing in action.

See also
Communes of the Marne department

References

Communes of Marne (department)